Funniest Wins is an American reality television competition on TBS show hosted by Marlon Wayans, in which comedians compete to be judged the funniest. The series ran from June 20 to August 15, 2014. The series holds a TV-14 rating, though some episodes are rated TV-MA. The series was later on cancelled on August 15, 2014.

Series overview

Contestants and progress

 The contestant won the competition. 
 The contestant(s) was the runner-up. 
 The contestant won the Elimination Challenge and was safe.
 The contestant received negative criticism in the Elimination Challenge, but was not in the bottom 2.
 The contestant was in the bottom 2 and was the last to be announced safe.
 The contestant was eliminated from the competition.

Episodes

See also
 Last Comic Standing

External links
 

2014 American television series debuts
2014 American television series endings
TBS (American TV channel) original programming
2010s American comedy game shows
2010s American reality television series
Improvisational television series